Stewart J. Schwab is an American law professor and former dean of Cornell Law School from 2004 to 2014.

Career
Schwab is an expert in economic analysis of the law and employment law.  He has been a member of the Cornell Law School faculty since 1983 and served as the Allan R. Tessler Dean of Cornell Law School from 2004 to 2014.  Schwab is currently a Reporter for the American Law Institute’s Restatement of Employment Law and serves as a co-editor for the Journal of Empirical Legal Studies. His scholarship is frequently listed among the highest rated in terms of scholarly impact  and in 2008 he was named one the nation’s 50 most powerful employment attorneys by the publication Human Resource Executive.

He earned his J.D. degree in law and his Ph.D. in economics from the University of Michigan and served as law clerk to Justice Sandra Day O'Connor of the U.S. Supreme Court and Judge James Dickson Phillips Jr., of the United States Court of Appeals for the Fourth Circuit.

Personal life
Schwab was born in 1954 in Chapel Hill, North Carolina, where he grew up and met his wife, Norma, in grade school. The two married in 1975. They have eight children and five grandchildren, and reside in Ithaca, New York.

Publications

Books authored

Selected scholarly publications
Splitting Logs: An Empirical Perspective on Employment Discrimination Settlements, 96 Cornell Law Review 931 (2011) (with M. Heise)
Employment Discrimination Plaintiffs in Federal Court: From Bad to Worse? 3 Harvard Law & Policy Review 103 (2009)
The Costs of Wrongful-Discharge Laws, 88 Review of Economics & Statistics 211-31 (May 2006) (with D. Autor & J. Donohue),
What Shapes Perceptions of the Federal Court System?, 56 University of Chicago Law Review 501 (Spring 1989) (with T. Eisenberg)

See also 
List of law clerks of the Supreme Court of the United States (Seat 8)

References

External links
 Cornell Law School Faculty Profile

1954 births
Cornell Law School faculty
Deans of law schools in the United States
Law clerks of the Supreme Court of the United States
Living people
Swarthmore College alumni
University of Michigan Law School alumni